National Highway 160A, commonly referred to as NH 160A is a national highway in India. It is a spur road of National Highway 60.  NH-160A runs in the state of Maharashtra in India.

Route 
NH160A connects Sinnar, Ghoti, Trimbakeshwar, Mokhada, Jawhar, Vikramgad, Manor and Palghar in the state of Maharashtra.

Junctions  
 
  Terminal near Sinnar.
  near Ghoti.
  near Trimbak.
  near Manor.

See also 
 List of National Highways in India
 List of National Highways in India by state

References

External links 

 NH 160A on OpenStreetMap

National highways in India
National Highways in Maharashtra